Make Me Feel may refer to:
"Make Me Feel" (Galantis and East & Young song), 2016
"Make Me Feel" (Janelle Monáe song), 2018
"Make Me Feel", a 2012 song by Michael Learns to Rock from Scandinavia

See also 
"Make Me Feel Better"
"Make Me Feel Good", Belters Only & Jazzy, 2021
"It Makes Me Feel Good", 1976 album by Cilla Black
"Makes Me Feel", 1994 song by Devotion